Royal Palace at Tell el-ful is an abandoned structure near Beit Hanina, atop a hill known as Tell el-Ful (Hill of Beans, Givat Shaul, lit. Hill of Saul).

History
The structure was intended to be a summer residence for King Hussein of Jordan, whose grandfather, King Abdullah I, conquered Jerusalem and the rest of the West Bank, annexing the territory after the 1948 Arab-Israeli War. 

Construction started in the mid-1960s, but was interrupted when Israel captured the area during the 1967 War. Still owned by the Hashemite Kingdom, it remains today as found in 1967, an unfinished shell.

The palace was built in reaction to the locating of the residence of Israel's president in West Jerusalem. Intended to be the official holiday retreat of the Jordanian royal family, it was to be an architectural masterpiece that would host dignitaries from around the world. The design envisaged a grandiose structure consisting of three levels, interconnected with arches plated with Jerusalem stone. Construction came to a halt after the 1967 war when Israel took control of the West Bank. The structure was still a building site and was left uncompleted. The skeletal, two-storey cement structure remained empty and has since become a haven for drug users. Local officials said that attempting to redevelop the building and end the neglect would potentially "raise a storm in Jordan." 

In August 2011, the Jerusalem municipality stopped unauthorised workers who had erected a fence around the site. The Jerusalem wakf denied that Jordan was preparing to renovate the palace.

Archaeology
The identification of tell el-Ful with biblical Gibeah, the capital of King Saul, is generally accepted and ruins of a fortress are apparent at the site. Due to the site's archaeological significance, a number of digs have occurred at the site, the first in 1868. Jordanian plans to build the royal palace atop the mound prompted a third excavation in 1964 which attempted to salvage and document the findings prior to construction work.

References

External links
360 degree view - Tel el Ful/Givat Shaul

Unfinished buildings and structures
Royal residences
Buildings and structures in Jerusalem
Hebrew Bible places
Jordanian construction in eastern Jerusalem
1960s in Jerusalem